Colin Campbell Norris (born 12 February 1976) is a serial killer nurse from Milton in Glasgow, Scotland, who murdered four "difficult" elderly patients and attempted to murder another in two hospitals in Leeds, England in 2002. Norris, who self-admittedly disliked elderly patients and had previously stolen hospital drugs, was the only person on duty when all the five patients inexplicably fell into sudden hypoglycaemic comas, despite the non-diabetic women only being in minor injury wards with merely broken hips. Suspicions were raised when Norris predicted that healthy Ethel Hall would die at 5:15 am one night, which is when she fell into a catastrophic arrest, and tests revealed that she had been injected with an extremely high level of man-made insulin. Insulin was missing from the hospital fridge and Norris had last accessed it, only half an hour before Hall fell unconscious. Subsequent investigations would find that the unnatural hypoglycaemic attacks followed him when he was transferred to a second hospital, and hospital records revealed that only he could not be eliminated as a suspect. Detectives believed that Norris was responsible for up to six other suspicious deaths where only he was always present, but a lack of post mortem evidence and other factors meant that investigators and the Crown Prosecution Service could not pursue convictions for these deaths. The murder inquiry was led by Chris Gregg and the investigation was praised for its thoroughness.

Doubts were later raised about his conviction by, among others, Professor Vincent Marks, an expert on insulin poisoning, who concluded from his own studies that there was a 1 in 10 chance that each patient's arrest could have happened naturally. Norris lost an appeal against his conviction in 2009. In February 2021 the Criminal Cases Review Commission referred the case back to the Court of Appeal, although in regards to Ethel Hall they said "there is no dispute that she was murdered by the injection of insulin."

Norris is believed to have been inspired by Jessie McTavish, a fellow Scottish nurse who was convicted of murdering a patient with insulin in 1974 before having her conviction quashed in 1975. The incident had happened at Ruchill Hospital in Glasgow, less than a mile from where Norris grew up. Shortly before he qualified as a nurse he had learned about McTavish.

Background 

Norris originally worked as a travel agent after leaving college, but after a few years in this role decided to retrain as a nurse. Friends described him as someone who loved being centre stage, and said he enjoyed amateur dramatics. His academic record was average, but he became known for being quick to anger and his aggressive confrontations with tutors and, later, employers. His behaviour towards university lecturers at the University of Dundee was described as "unacceptable". He constantly argued with his tutor, and he later said of her: "my tutor and I didn't exactly see eye to eye. I had a personality clash, basically 'cos I had one and she never, and she was my personal tutor." Shortly before he qualified, this tutor was known to have taught Norris about Jessie McTavish, a nurse convicted of murdering a patient with insulin at Ruchill Hospital in Glasgow, less than a mile from where Norris grew up (she was later released on appeal on a technicality). Norris was tasked with "reviewing" her conduct by his tutor. Learning about McTavish would later be regarded as a likely inspiration for Norris, and he would have learned at this point that insulin is the perfect weapon for murder because it leaves the blood very quickly.

Norris began working in Leeds after qualifying in June 2001, but quickly fell out with experienced authority figures, finding it difficult to be told no or what to do. Colleagues recounted him saying that he didn't like working on minor injury wards or with old people and wanted to work in the emergency department because it was more 'exciting' for him. He said he "wasn't put on this earth to sit in an office." The hospital later found out that he had been secretly working as a nurse in other hospitals on occasions when he claimed to be off sick or attending a training course.

His partner said after his conviction that Norris had once hit him during an argument, bruising his head, and once threw a bottle at him, which caused him to break up with him. He also said that, around the time of the murders, Norris had become engrossed by a storyline in Holby City, in which a serial killer nurse played by Rachel Leskovac killed patients with insulin before eventually being uncovered as a murderer. This same storyline is believed to have inspired another UK nurse to kill his patients, Benjamin Geen. In the month in which he began killing patients with overdoses, Geen appeared in an edition of the Banbury Citizen which featured an interview with Leskovac. Norris's partner would also reveal after Norris's conviction that Norris had experimented on his cat Casper before he began killing patients, injecting it with a lethal dose of insulin and killing it. The partner had reported him to the police but Norris claimed the cat had died as it hit its head on a wall.

Norris's stepmother, who was in her 40s, worked as a sex worker in Glasgow, and was convicted of three prostitution-related offences between 2004 and 2006.

Dislike of elderly 

As a trainee nurse Norris often refused to work with elderly patients, saying he "didn't want to be working with that type of person", which was distinctly unusual for someone working in the medical profession. He admitted to police he found elderly patients challenging. Openly gay, Norris said he had a particular dislike of the intimate care of women. He said that he found it difficult to wash elderly female patients who couldn't bathe themselves because he "couldn't get used to the smells". At times during his placements he repeatedly refused to change patients or their bedding. He had previously told another nurse during a training placement in 2001 that he "didn't like working with geriatric patients", and something minor such as an elderly patient throwing bed covers off could cause him considerable anger. He had also said he hated his training placements in geriatric units. Norris refused to attend his one placement at a nursing home for the elderly, and also often called in sick during placements at other nursing homes, including calling in sick after only three days at a nursing home and not returning. After starting work in October 2001 he told a colleague he was having second thoughts about a career in nursing because he didn't like old people.

According to his father, Norris once stole from his own grandparents before he was a nurse while they slept in the family home following a funeral. When his son was charged with the murders in 2005, Norris's father was quoted as saying: 

The incident, which happened in around 1995, caused Norris's father to disown him. The father also said that his son had also demanded £18,000 from him as payback for his parents divorcing. The father said there was "something not quite right about him".

Police would later discover that Norris had repeatedly mistreated elderly patients in the early months of his nursing career at the same Leeds hospitals in which he would later go on to murder patients. In one instance, an elderly man asked Norris to empty his catheter bag, only for Norris to flatly refuse and insist he do it himself, before going off duty. The elderly man then collapsed after trying to reach the bathroom by himself. Other patients stated that Norris had treated them in an offhand and callous manner, and that Norris had an apparent dislike of old people. Two elderly ex-patients said that Norris had verbally abused them after they rang an emergency buzzer on a ward when an elderly patient climbed out of bed, with Norris then saying to them "I hope you suffer" and "rot in hell".

Previous crimes  
Norris was found to have committed a theft in the early part of his nursing career. He had assisted another colleague in stealing drugs from a hospital but was caught. Norris would have known that he risked losing his job for the theft, since the drugs inventory in the hospital was closely monitored, but he did not lose his position. Police investigating his subsequent murders would later note that this event indicated Norris's lack of integrity in his role early on.

Murders

Ethel Hall
At the time of the murders, Norris worked at Leeds General Infirmary and St James's University Hospital in Leeds, having only qualified as a nurse a year earlier. Suspicions were raised when Norris predicted the death of one patient, Ethel Hall, saying to a fellow nurse hours before: "I predict 5:15 am as being the time Ethel Hall will become unwell" since he "had a feeling about her". He said that he thought Hall was "going off tonight" and that he was a "jinx" on the hospital. This was despite there being no medical indications of an impending illness, and Hall only being on the ward for a fractured hip. Norris complained that he would have to fill out the paperwork for her death. Hall duly fell catastrophically ill that morning around 5 am and she died some weeks later. When nurses including Norris came to tend to her, he tapped his watch and said to the nurse he had predicted Hall's illness to earlier: "I told you". A doctor later recounted feeling "annoyed" at Norris's slow reaction to the collapse. An anonymous male nurse called Hall's son from the hospital at 5:30 am that morning telling him that she had taken a "turn for the worse", and it was not established who this man was. The next night Norris specifically called the ward to ask what had happened to Hall.

A blood sample was taken from Hall after a doctor raised concerns and ordered blood tests, and her blood was found to contain an inexplicably massive amount of insulin – 1000 units in just one sample – and this became the main hard evidence in the police case. The doctor who had ordered the tests was a diabetes expert who specialised in insulin and hypoglycaemic episodes, and she had believed the incident to be suspicious. No doctor or medical staff member had prescribed her this drug, and she had no condition that required it to be issued. The amount of insulin in Hall's blood was about 12 times the normal level, and it had been injected into her system. The insulin was manufactured and not produced naturally in the body. It had been injected into her abdomen, as indicated by the fact that a bulge was found under her skin there that was consistent with a large injection of fluid. Doctors believed it was done by someone with nursing or medical experience. The results of the tests led the hospital to contact the police.

It was discovered after Hall's death that insulin had also been taken from the storage fridge, and Norris later admitted that he was the last person to have accessed this fridge before Hall had been injected with insulin. Two vials of insulin were found to have been taken from the fridge, which had to have been taken by someone during the night shift which Norris was working when Hall became unwell. Norris had on a previous occasion been caught stealing drugs from the hospital. Norris also admitted that he was the last person to see Hall at 4.30 am, half an hour before she fell into the coma at around 5 am.

Previous cases

Norris immediately came under suspicion and was questioned by police about Hall's murder. It was further decided to investigate the deaths of 72 people who had died on the ward while Norris was working, and a special medical panel decided that 18 of the 72 deaths should be reviewed by independent medical experts. The experts confirmed police suspicions that the deaths of three women were as a result of lethal injections of insulin, but they also identified two more victims, one who had also died of insulin poisoning and another who had survived a massive injected overdose. Along with Ethel Hall, none of these women were diabetic (nor was anyone else on the ward), and all of them had been admitted to the wards simply suffering from broken hips. In any case, the amount of insulin Hall had been injected with was far in excess of what any diabetic patient would need. They were also all murdered while in non-emergency orthopaedic wards, where only minor, non life-threatening things such as broken bones are treated.  When questioned about the cases Norris said "he seemed to have been unlucky over the last 12 months".

The first three incidents occurred at Leeds General Infirmary. They began in May 2002, which also notably happened to be when the detailed probationary monitoring of Norris's early progress as a newly qualified nurse ended. On 17 May 2002 Norris injected patient Vera Wilby with an overdose of the painkiller morphine to make her drowsy (as recorded in the hospital notes and later admitted by Norris), despite the fact that she was in no pain and needed no morphine. He then inexplicably administered insulin before going off shift. 90 minutes after he went off shift, Wilby was found to be semi-conscious and suffering from a sudden and inexplicable hypoglycaemic attack, but she survived. Wilby had dementia and had been seen as a "difficult" patient by Norris. On 12 June, another patient was admitted to Norris's ward with a broken hip, Doris Ludlam. On 25 June, she was also given an unnecessary injection of morphine (as recorded in the hospital notes and later admitted by Norris) followed by an overdose of insulin, and Norris then again went off shift. She was discovered in a coma 40 minutes after he went off shift. 88-year-old Bridget Bourke, who had been admitted to the ward on 16 June also with a broken hip, was then discovered at 3.10 am on 21 July (by Norris) suffering from an inexplicable hypoglycaemic attack and she died the next day. 

Norris was then transferred to St James's University Hospital, and on 10 October, 79-year-old Irene Crooks was admitted to Norris's new ward with a broken hip. Despite Norris recording that her condition was improving, he supposedly found her "totally unresponsive" just before 6 am on 19 October, having suffered a hypoglycaemic attack. She then died the next day. It was deemed significant that the bizarre cases of hypoglycaemia appeared to follow Norris when he transferred to the new hospital - especially since he was the only staff member who had been transferred. He was the only staff member who worked on both the wards in the two hospitals where all the hypoglycaemic incidents were occurring. A colleague later stated that Norris had shown no desire to revive Crookes after she fell into a coma. Another colleague also later testified that Norris had watched in "detached amusement" after one of the victims had fallen into a coma. She said that "everything he did that night had to be prompted". Significantly, it was discovered by a member of staff that they had suddenly run out of insulin after Crooke's hypoglycaemic attack.

It is believed that by the time Hall was killed, Norris had become confident he could carry on killing without being caught, since blood tests that would have revealed that they had been given overdoses with insulin had not been taken. He would not have expected, therefore, a blood sample to have been taken from Hall and sent to a specialist laboratory as it was, which finally led to him being caught. He likely would have thought that the death would be written off as another natural death.

None of the patients had been prescribed insulin by any doctors of medical staff members in the hospital. All of the victims were considered somewhat "difficult" patients, which likely irritated Norris with his dislike for elderly patients. One of the women had been throwing her bedclothes off just before he killed her. Bourke was on Norris's ward at the same time as Ludlam and Wilby, meaning he had contact with all three at the same time. In each case, the fatal dose of insulin had been administered at night, when Norris worked. At the time of Hall's death, Norris suspiciously said to colleagues: "it is always in the morning when things go wrong" and "someone always dies when I do nights". He also would have known doctors were also never on duty overnight at the hospitals, meaning that they couldn't help the patients when they all collapsed during the Norris's nightshifts. Amongst the things the victims all had in common was that they were all frail women and that they all died after only suffering broken hips.

Investigation

It was found that the only nurse that had cared for all five of the patients and had been there within 2 hours of them becoming catastrophically ill was Norris. Norris had been one of the few who was on duty at the time of Hall's deterioration in health. Police analysed medical staff rotas, phone records and personnel files to determine who had access to the wards, insulin and who was on the wards at the time of that incident, and it was found that all staff members except Norris could be ruled out as it was only Norris who was on duty when all the incidents occurred. He was also the only staff member who worked on both the wards where the incidents occurred. Norris admitted predicting the time of Hall's death to his colleague but said it was because he had a "black sense of humour". Investigators ordered the exhumation of the body of Bridget Bourke, which, significantly, revealed that she had been given large amounts of insulin. The other two patients who had died had their bodies cremated, so could not be tested.

Norris was suspended from his job (while being fully paid) as the police investigation was carried out. After he was first arrested, Norris immediately left Leeds and went back to Scotland, before then leaving the UK eight times to go abroad, including to Tenerife for a six month holiday. After his conviction his partner would recount an incident around this time when Norris became violent and drunk, and wouldn't stop crying because he said he was scared of going to prison. Norris's mother defended her son's trips around Europe, saying he was "trying to live his life the best he could while under the pressure of a police investigation".

When police questioned Norris about the fact that the vials of insulin, the murder weapon in Hall's case, had gone missing from the fridge that morning when Hall was killed, he responded by saying: "obviously if someone was to kill someone, they wouldn't leave their signature would they? To say that they were there". He denied ever injecting Hall with insulin. The police were dismissive of Norris's claim that an intruder must have come in during the nightshift through the fire escape while nurses were having a cigarette before injecting Hall. Norris said this despite revealing he had never once seen an intruder on the ward. Detectives believed this suggestion that an intruder had snuck onto a bay at night to inject a patient before sneaking away without anybody realising (since no other staff member could have been responsible) was highly implausible. 

Norris behaved particularly bizarrely in the interviews he had with the police. Throughout the interviews he acted notably aggressive and arrogant, challenging detectives, and became physically angry at times to the point where he had to be restrained.  Investigators stated that Norris did not seem to be explicitly denying the murders, but insisting that they could not be proved, demanding officers told him how he did it and saying that he didn't think their facts were "good enough" to prove he had killed them. Criminologist Dr Jane Monkton-Smith stated that it was particularly unusual that Norris didn't behave as if he wanted to defend himself in interviews, but instead wanted to challenge the police and act evasively. Norris would later admit that he was trying to show how much more he knew than the police in interviews. In 2004, during the investigation, he walked into the offices of the Yorkshire Evening Post and declared that the police had "nothing on him" to reporters.

Chief Superintendent on the case Chris Gregg, holder of the Queen's Police Medal and who caught David Bieber, 'Wearside Jack' and the killer of Leanne Tiernan, said that Norris's prediction of Hall's illness showed that it wasn't just a spontaneous incident where a criminal nurse at work had, for whatever reason decided to kill someone, saying "he actually premeditated this, hours before". Gregg said: "I think he was cocky; I think he was over-confident. He was showing off". A criminal psychologist stated that, despite Norris's prediction, it was unlikely that he wanted to get caught, rather that he merely wanted to demonstrate a sense of superior knowledge. Police noted that, in interviews, Norris showed no empathy for the women who had died or for their families, and claimed he couldn't remember any of the women.

Trial

Norris, recorded as being of Egilsay Terrace, Glasgow, went to trial in 2007 at Newcastle Crown Court. Norris's father did not object to the decision to charge his son, whom he described as "scum". At trial Norris denied ever having predicted Hall's death, despite having admitted this in police interviews. He admitted giving Vera Wilby and Doris Ludlam overdoses of morphine on 17 May and 25 June 2002 respectively (police had found these injections recorded by him in the hospital records). He had given Ludlam twice the allowed dose of morphine. It was highlighted that, when police first interviewed him, Norris had not mentioned the cases of Ludlam, Bourke and Crookes when he was asked if he had ever had experience of patients falling into to hypoglycaemic comas, even though that is what they had experienced when Norris was on duty. Police said they believed this was done on purpose so he didn't arouse suspicion about those cases at that stage, since they had not yet been uncovered by investigators. It was also brought to the jury's attention that documents had been found at Norris's home detailing a less painful way of injecting morphine. Norris claimed, despite the blood test evidence, that none of the patients had been injected and if they were then an 'intruder' must have done it (since records showed no other staff member could have been responsible). This is despite the fact that the insulin fridge, where the drug had apparently been taken from, had a coded access and only medical staff could access it.

Norris was convicted by an almost unanimous jury decision, an 11-1 majority verdict, on 3 March 2008, for the murder of four women, and the attempted murder of a fifth (Vera Wilby, aged 90). He was sentenced to life imprisonment, and ordered to serve a minimum term of 30 years in prison the following day. Norris had acted particularly aggressively throughout the trial, banging on the windows of the judge and attacking members of the press when departing the court, shoving two against a wall. Pictures of these attacks were not shown on television for fear of influencing the jury. The judge told Norris when sentencing: "You are, I have absolutely no doubt, a thoroughly evil and dangerous man. You are an arrogant and manipulative man with a real dislike of elderly patients. The most telling evidence was that observation of one of your patients, Bridget Tarpey, who said 'he did not like us old women'. My view is you did not like them because they required too much nursing and were too demanding of your time. You are in my judgment essentially lazy as evidenced by your absences from student placements and work."

Norris's mother June Morrison said she was "so proud of him".

Referred to in the British press as the "Angel of Death", Norris was convicted of killing his victims by injecting them with high levels of insulin. The four victims were: 
Doris Ludlam, died 27 June 2002.
Bridget Bourke, died 22 July 2002.
Irene Crooks, died 20 October 2002.
Ethel Hall, died 11 December 2002.

All of these victims had been killed in Norris's first year of working as a nurse. Hall was a mother of one and a grandmother of two. Ludlam was a mother of two, a grandmother and great grandmother who had worked as a nursery school teacher and fostered children for the charity Barnardo's. Wilby was a vulnerable widow. Crooks died on her 79th birthday, unable to ever open her cards or presents. Hall's son Stuart expressed his relief at Norris's conviction, stating: "I think he needs to be kept inside". He added: "He has got the knowledge to kill people and to do it discreetly. That makes him a danger to society and he must be kept inside. We hope Colin Norris never leaves prison and can never harm anyone else again." 

After the verdict was announced, Leeds Teaching Hospitals NHS Trust apologised to the victims' families for Norris's "disturbing" crimes, subsequently describing him as an "extremely dangerous criminal". In 2009, the Nursing and Midwifery Council struck off Norris from the medical register, taking just 5 minutes to come to a decision on the matter.

Norris is imprisoned in HM Prison Frankland.

Praise for police investigation

The judge commended the investigation led by Chris Gregg and Detective Inspector Martin Hepworth, as well as the Crown Prosecution Service caseworkers, saying: 

Independently, Leeds Teaching Hospitals NHS Trust approved of the investigation carried out by the police and their decision to charge Norris, with a spokesperson stating: "The charges are the result of an extremely comprehensive police investigation". The investigation was also supported by the university Norris trained at, Dundee University. Several reviews of the investigation were made by external, independent police officers to ensure it was run to the correct standard. Overall, the extensive inquiry took three years to complete.

Lead detective Chris Gregg is widely regarded as one of the country's best detectives, and has been described as such in Parliament. As well as the Norris case, he also presided over the investigations that led to the capture and convictions of infamous criminals David Bieber and John Taylor (the killer of Leanne Tiernan) as well as 'Wearside Jack' (the Yorkshire Ripper hoaxer). The Chief Constable of West Yorkshire Police, Sir Norman Bettison, described Gregg as "one of the finest Detective Chief Superintendents West Yorkshire has known" and said "I don't use that phrase lightly as Chris stands alongside some of the great investigators that West Yorkshire Police has had". He was awarded the Queen's Police Medal for his services to policing in 2008 and founded Axiom International Limited with award-winning forensic scientist Dr Angela Gallop, who herself was dubbed "The Queen of Crime-Solving" by The Guardian in 2022.

Other suspected victims 
After the trial, Chris Gregg revealed that he and the other detectives believed Norris had been responsible for up to six other deaths at the hospitals. He was the only nurse on duty when three other suspicious deaths occurred, but police felt there was not enough evidence to pursue convictions for them. Norris had also been arrested for another death of a patient, but the Crown Prosecution Service decided to not charge him in this case because of "complicating factors". In two other suspicious cases, the fact that there had been no post-mortem examinations prevented enough evidence being accumulated to charge Norris for their deaths.

Motive 

 

Jessie McTavish, a nurse convicted and then controversially cleared of the 1974 murder of an 80-year-old patient with insulin, has been identified as the likely inspiration for Norris. She had worked at Ruchill Hospital in Glasgow, less than a mile from where Norris grew up. She had been released on appeal after her defence team successfully argued that the trial judge had inadvertently misled the jury in his final summing up, even though the appeal court judges said that it was something a "few words could have cured" and that there was enough evidence to support the prosecution. Norris's personal tutor at university gave a specific talk to him and other students on her case on 11 January 2001, a year before Norris committed his first attack, in which Norris used the same method as McTavish had been accused of using. Norris was tasked with "reviewing" her conduct, and in doing so, he would have learned that insulin is the perfect weapon for murder because it leaves the blood very quickly. Just like Norris, McTavish had 'predicted' the exact time when a healthy patient would die. She was able to continue her career in nursing after she was released on appeal. Norris had notably also attended lectures in 1999 on diabetes and the treatment of diabetic patients with insulin, where he learned about the consequences of blood sugars being too high or too low.

Forensic psychiatrist Sir Richard Badcock, the only psychiatrist to formally assess the serial killer doctor Harold Shipman, stated his belief that Norris was a psychopath, who killed elderly patients simply because they got in his way. Just like Norris, Shipman's motive was not immediately clear. Chris Gregg said that he believed that Norris decided to poison the women simply because he found elderly patients irritating. Psychologist and senior lecturer at Manchester Metropolitan University Dr David Holmes concluded that Norris was searching for a sense of power, since a medical staff member like him "administers literally life and death to affirm their own status or self-appointed status". High-profile criminologist David Wilson commented on the case of Norris and other recently convicted serial killers by saying: "What's happening at the moment is that new groups are emerging as being vulnerable to attack".

Aftermath

Failed appeal 
Norris appealed against his conviction in 2009. Originally, Norris planned to appeal on the grounds that the trial judge had shown a "lack of balance", but then scrapped these plans and sacked his legal team. He subsequently appealed on the grounds that the judge had "misdirected" the jury in his final summary but he lost this appeal, with judge Lord Justice Aikens ruling the convictions were "safe" and saying that the case against Norris was "very strong indeed". The appeal court rejected both grounds of the appeal, saying that the judge's directions "cannot validly be criticised" and that there was no misdirection to the jury. The appeal court instead said that the judge's summary in the original case was an exemplary "tour de force". The judges also refused to believe that the deaths were "coincidental". Norris's defence team had argued that the deaths could have been the result of 'naturally' raised insulin levels caused by severe spontaneous hypoglycaemia, but the judges rejected this possibility. 

Part of Norris's appeal was also based on his claim that another nurse at the hospital could have driven two hours from where she was known to have been at the time and come onto the ward and injected patients before escaping, but this was rejected by the appeal court judges. The Criminal Case Review Commission was given scientific information that the test which had established that Ethel Hall's blood was full of insulin was inaccurate, and that it was therefore not possible for her to have been murdered by an overdose of insulin. In 2021, the Criminal Case Review Commission discounted this claim when they said that there was "no dispute" that Hall was "murdered by the injection of insulin". The CCRC considered that Norris' conviction for Hall's murder relies on support from the other four convictions and the Crown's claim that no one else apart from Norris was responsible. The Commission was "satisfied" that the claim that Norris was solely responsible is "less secure" with the new expert evidence.

Inquiry 
In 2010, an independent inquiry into Norris's murders was held. The inquiry recommended the introduction of 'student practice passports', which would report on the personality and integrity of students while they trained as medical professionals at university. It was felt that this may have flagged up Norris as an issue earlier had they been in use at the time of his studying, since he had knowingly acted aggressively during placements, had a poor absence record and had clashed with tutors on numerous occasions. These 'passports', it was argued, would allow universities to evaluate at the end of a student's course whether the individual was fit to join the medical register. The inquiry found that the University of Dundee had not identified Norris's difficulties in its reference to employers, and the inquiry concluded that organisational, systems and cultural factors provided an opportunity for Norris to murder the four women in 2002. Nurse managers had already been urged after Norris's conviction in 2008 to take greater care when recruiting staff, and NHS Employers had introduced new guidance on pre-employment checks.

Claim of innocence 
On 4 October 2011 the BBC reported that retired Professor Vincent Marks – a leading expert on insulin poisoning – was concerned about Norris's conviction. He had been asked by the Norris family to find evidence in the case. He claimed the jury at Norris's trial was wrongly led to believe by experts that a cluster of hypoglycaemic episodes, among people who were not diabetic, was sinister. After carrying out his own studies, he said: "Looking at all the evidence, all I can say is I think Colin Norris's conviction is unsafe". He claimed that his own studies had shown that up to 1 in 10 of hypoglycaemia episodes in elderly people were caused naturally. However, according to statistical experts, severe hypoglycaemic episodes in non-diabetic patients held in minor injury wards are still a very rare occurrence, and to have five such cases in a broken bones ward in such a short space of time, of which four of the cases led to the death of the patients, was extraordinary. The scientific expert called by Norris's defence team himself said at trial that the five cases being present at the same place in small space of time was extraordinary. The chances of a 1 in 10 event happening on five occasions is only 0.001%, or 1 in 100,000.

Prof Marks says the four patients picked out by the experts after Mrs Hall's death "were all at very high risk of developing spontaneous hypoglycaemia" because they had risk factors such as malnutrition, infection and multi-organ failure. However, when an individual has a hypoglycaemic attack from insulin that is produced naturally in the body, C-peptides are produced which will be detected in any blood tests. The analysis of tests on all of the victims in this case did not show any presence of C-peptides, indicating that the insulin was introduced into their bodies externally. The deaths were also all suspicious deaths, with the initial pathologist's inquest into Hall's death, for instance, concluding that there was no natural explanation for her death.

In 2011 Louise Shorter, the former producer of BBC's Rough Justice,  and journalist Mark Daly produced the documentary A Jury in the Dark, arguing that there were logical, non-criminal explanations for all the deaths. They and professor Marks claimed that Ethel Hall's hypoglycaemic arrest could have been caused naturally by 'auto-immune syndrome'. This claim was later conclusively discounted by the Criminal Case Review Commission in 2021, when they concluded that "there is no dispute that she was murdered by the injection of insulin" and said that natural hypoglycaemia was evidently not a possible explanation in her case. The possibility of auto-immune syndrome having caused the women's arrests had also already been considered and rejected at the trial. During research for the film, however, Daly stated he discovered an additional death at Leeds General Infirmary which police had initially been investigating as a potential murder carried out by a male nurse, however; the death "went from suspicious to non-suspicious", when police learned that Norris was not on duty at the time. Norris's mother has tried to prove her son innocent, saying: "Either I am the mother of Scotland's worst serial killer or mother to the victim of the country's most terrible miscarriage of justice". After watching the BBC programme the sister-in-law of victim Bridget Bourke said that she was still convinced of Norris's guilt.

In May 2013 the Criminal Cases Review Commission confirmed it was re-examining the Norris case in the light of new medical and scientific evidence contradictory to that submitted to the jury during the original trial. However, in 2014, the son of victim Vera Wilby, John Barrie Wilby, said that he was "sad and upset" about the claims that Norris may be innocent, and said that he was still convinced of his guilt. In the same year there was outrage amongst elderly residents when a benefit concert was held for Norris in Dundee, with a spokesperson of the Dundee Pensioners' Forum stating: "Having a party for someone convicted of murdering all these elderly, vulnerable people is disgraceful. It's a slap in the face doing it, with all those families still grieving their loved ones". The Times declared he was one of "the 11 most evil staff in the NHS". In January 2015 the foreman of the jury that convicted Norris, after being shown the evidence in the BBC programme, said that he now believes him to be innocent; apparently the second member of the jury to do so (although this would still leave enough jury members to convict him, 10). He said that "the evidence shows a murder wasn't committed at all" (although in 2021 the CCRC concluded that Hall's case at least was indeed a clear murder). 

In February 2021 the CCRC stated that after a "detailed review of this complex and difficult case" they had decided to refer the case to the Court of Appeal. It was said there was a serious possibility that the conviction was unsafe. In regards to the Ethel Hall case, the CCRC said that "there is no dispute that she was murdered by the injection of insulin". The experts who advised the CCRC said that it was not possible for a natural hypoglycaemic episode to have caused Hall's death, but could not exclude it being a possibility in the other four cases. This is despite the fact that Norris's defence team stated that Hall's case was a case of natural death, as with the others. The CCRC said that, in reaching the decision, they had been "greatly assisted" by the evidence of the experts employed by Norris's defence team.

In popular culture
In 2008, Norris's case was the focus of an ITV Real Crime documentary.

See also
 List of serial killers in the United Kingdom

References

External links
2008 Real Crime documentary on Norris
2016 Nurses Who Kill documentary on Norris, via STV player
Convictions Unsafe

1976 births
21st-century Scottish criminals
British people convicted of attempted murder
Criminals from Glasgow
Scottish gay men
20th-century Scottish LGBT people
21st-century Scottish LGBT people
Living people
Male nurses
Male serial killers
Medical serial killers
Nurses convicted of killing patients
People convicted of murder by England and Wales
People with antisocial personality disorder
Poisoners
Prisoners sentenced to life imprisonment by England and Wales
Scottish nurses
Scottish people convicted of murder
Scottish prisoners sentenced to life imprisonment
Scottish serial killers